Moussa Nébié (born ) is a Burkinabé diplomat who was Minister of Foreign Affairs of Burkina Faso from July 2015 to January 2016.

Career
Nébié was appointed as Minister of Foreign Affairs on 20 July 2015 by transitional President Michel Kafando, who relinquished the title, following a reshuffle in the run up to the 2015 elections. Prior to becoming Foreign Minister, Nébié was Minister of State for Regional Cooperation, and before that, he served as Ambassador to Egypt and Ambassador to Ethiopia and the African Union.

References

1959 births
Living people
Burkinabé diplomats
Foreign ministers of Burkina Faso
Government ministers of Burkina Faso
Ambassadors of Burkina Faso to Egypt
Ambassadors of Burkina Faso to Ethiopia
21st-century Burkinabé people